King Osei Gyan (born 22 December 1988) is a Ghanaian former professional footballer who played as a midfielder. He played for Fulham, Germinal Beerschot, Viking and Halmstads BK.

Club career 
Gyan trained at the Right to Dream Academy in Ghana before leaving his home country for the United States to further his football career. While attending Dunn School, Gyan was honored as a 2005 NSCAA/adidas Boys High School All-America Team.  That same year, he was awarded the 2005 NSCAA/adidas High School Boys State Player of the Year for the state of California. In 2006, he joined the youth system of English Premiership club Fulham, and in 2008 was loaned to Belgian  Jupiler League side Germinal Beerschot until 2010 due to work permit issues. He was released in the summer of 2010.

In January 2011, Gyan joined Canadian club Toronto FC of Major League Soccer on trial for their pre-season in Antalya, Turkey.
After a two-week training camp with Viking, he signed a contract with the Norwegian Premier League club.
Swedish club Halmstads BK signed him on a one-year contract after a week of tryouts on 11 February 2014.

Gyan retired from professional football in 2016, and has since worked for the Right to Dream Academy.

International career 
Gyan represented Ghana at senior international level in a friendly fixture against Tanzania in 2008.

References

External links
Profile on Ghanaweb

1988 births
Living people
Footballers from Accra
Ghanaian footballers
Ghana international footballers
Association football midfielders
Right to Dream Academy players
Fulham F.C. players
Beerschot A.C. players
Viking FK players
Halmstads BK players
Belgian Pro League players
Eliteserien players
Allsvenskan players
Ghanaian expatriate footballers
Expatriate footballers in England
Ghanaian expatriate sportspeople in England
Expatriate footballers in Belgium
Ghanaian expatriate sportspeople in Belgium
Expatriate footballers in Sweden
Ghanaian expatriate sportspeople in Sweden
Expatriate footballers in Norway
Ghanaian expatriate sportspeople in Norway